David William Leslie (9 November 1953 – 30 March 2008) was a Scottish  racing driver. He was most associated with the British Touring Car Championship, in which he was runner-up in 1999. He was particularly noted for his development skill, helping both Honda and Nissan become BTCC race winners. He was born in Dumfries, Scotland.

Career

Leslie was Scottish karting champion 5 times before switching to cars, winning the Formula Ford title in 1978. He later moved to the British Formula Three Championship from 1981 to 1984, becoming involved with the Ecurie Ecosse team.  With Ecosse, he moved to the World Sportscar Championship, driving to multiple C2 class victories and helping the team earn the 1986 championship. Leslie himself would earn second place in the Drivers Championship in 1987 alongside teammate Ray Mallock. Leslie and the team also finished second in the C2 class and 8th overall in the 1987 24 Hours of Le Mans. Ecosse eventually took over the Aston Martin sports car program before Leslie departed in 1990 to become part of Tom Walkinshaw's Jaguar team. Leslie competed at the 24 Hours of Le Mans a total of 10 times, including driving the works Jaguar XJ220 in 1993 alongside Win Percy and Armin Hahne, only to retire with engine failure while in contention for the lead of the GT class.

Leslie maintained his links with Ecosse when the team moved to the British Touring Car Championship in 1990. He competed on a partial schedule for the first two seasons before becoming a full-time driver for Vauxhall in 1992. He took his first win a year later, and earned a total of six pole positions over those two years, both of which ended in top 10 championship placements.

1994 was an unsuccessful season in a Mazda, but for 1995 he joined Honda as they entered the series for the first time. The car was late getting onto the track in pre-season, and reliability was initially poor, however he finished 10th overall after a strong end to the season. 1996 started badly with several collisions, but a victory in the British Grand Prix support meeting kick-started a strong second half of the season, allowing him to snatch 4th overall at the final round of the season.

For the BTCC in 1997 James Thompson and Gabriele Tarquini raced the Hondas and Leslie switched to Nissan alongside Anthony Reid. Again the car was initially uncompetitive, and much of the credit for its eventual success is widely attributed to Leslie. In 1998, he achieved two victories and five podiums for Nissan, finishing seventh in the standings. He also did a one-off appearance in the British GT Championship that same year at the British Grand Prix supporting race, finishing third in a Porsche 911 GT1 shared with Matt Neal. In 1999, he finished a close runner up in the championship standings to teammate Laurent Aïello, with three race wins and 10 podiums.

The company pulled out after that, and Leslie did only occasional races in 2000. Notably for the works Honda team in one round of the 2000 European Super Touring Cup and three rounds of the 2000 British Touring Car Championship – one for the works Honda team and two in the private PRO Motorsport Nissan Primera. He competed at the Spa 24 Hours that same year, sharing a Honda Accord with James Kaye and Mark Lemmer, but retired with engine failure. He also drove for Marcos in the 2000 British GT Championship for a select number of rounds, finishing on the podium at Croft. He contested the Speedvision Challenge in the US during 2001 in addition to another outing in the British GT Championship (Knockhill), once again in a Marcos and finishing on the class podium.

He joined Proton in the BTCC for the 2002 and 2003 seasons, but the project was not a great success. He did, however, manage to secure two third-place results and was the best-placed Proton in both seasons. Thereafter Leslie provided commentary for Eurosport on the World Touring Car Championship series, although he continued to occasionally participate in the Britcar series.

For the past three years, he had been lecturing Motorsports Management, part-time at Swansea Metropolitan University.

Allan McNish credited the start he, David Coulthard, and Dario Franchitti were given at the start of their careers as largely to Leslie and his late father David senior.

Death

Leslie died on 30 March 2008, when the private jet he was travelling in crashed into a housing estate in Farnborough. He was flying with fellow racing driver and team owner Richard Lloyd and data engineer Chris Allarton. They were travelling to the Nogaro Circuit in France to test for Lloyd's Apex Motorsport in preparation for the FIA GT3 European Championship.

The investigation into the crash found that a combination of incorrectly identified, non-critical system failures led to the in-flight shut-down of both engines, with the crew unable to restart them in time to avoid the impact.

Racing record

Complete British Formula One Championship results
(key) (Races in bold indicate pole position; races in italics indicate fastest lap)

Complete British Touring Car Championship results
(key) Races in bold indicate pole position (1 point awarded – 1996–2002 all races, 2003 just in first race) Races in italics indicate fastest lap (1 point awarded – 2000–2003 all races) * signifies that driver lead race for at least one lap (1 point awarded – 1998–2002 just for feature race, 2003 all races)

‡ Endurance driver (Ineligible for points in 1990)

Complete Swedish Touring Car Championship results
(key) (Races in bold indicate pole position) (Races in italics indicate fastest lap)

Complete European Touring Car Championship results
(key) (Races in bold indicate pole position) (Races in italics indicate fastest lap)

24 Hours of Le Mans results

24 Hours of Spa results

Complete British GT Championship results
(key) (Races in bold indicate pole position) (Races in italics indicate fastest lap)

Britcar 24 Hour results

References

External links

BTCC pages profile
David Leslie Online Memorial 

1953 births
2008 deaths
Scottish racing drivers
Formula Ford drivers
British Formula Three Championship drivers
British Touring Car Championship drivers
Swedish Touring Car Championship drivers
People associated with Swansea Metropolitan University
24 Hours of Le Mans drivers
24 Hours of Spa drivers
European Le Mans Series drivers
Sportspeople from Dumfries
World Sportscar Championship drivers
European Touring Car Championship drivers
Scottish Formula One drivers
British Formula One Championship drivers
Britcar drivers
British GT Championship drivers
Victims of aviation accidents or incidents in England
Victims of aviation accidents or incidents in 2008
Jaguar Racing drivers
Ecurie Ecosse drivers